"Sexy Robótica" is the official second single from iDon, it was released on June 5, 2009, it was originally selected as the first single, back later the producers decided that "Virtual Diva" were the first single and "Sexy Robótica" the second single from iDon.

Music video
The music video was filmed in Miami and was directed by Carlos R. Pérez who also made Virtual Diva music video. The music video reached #1 of the most downloaded on iTunes in the first week of being released.

Concept
On the video, Vera building downtown Miami was transformed into a mysterious underground complex. Through the video, attractive dancers are a mix of energy and sensual activities represented in several scenes in which Don Omar performs "Sexy Robótica", the music video was released on Don Omar official Universal Music website on July 10.

Track listing
US Digital download
"Sexy Robótica" (Album Version) – 3:54

Charts

References

External links
 iDon.com
 "Sexy Robótica" (music video) iDon.com

2009 singles
Don Omar songs
2009 songs
Machete Music singles
Songs written by James Brown
Songs written by Don Omar